The 2021 Internationaux Féminins de la Vienne was a professional women's tennis tournament played on indoor hard courts. It was the twenty-seventh edition of the tournament which was part of the 2021 ITF Women's World Tennis Tour. It took place in Poitiers, France between 25 and 31 October 2021.

Singles main-draw entrants

Seeds

 1 Rankings are as of 18 October 2021.

Other entrants
The following players received wildcards into the singles main draw:
  Estelle Cascino
  Émeline Dartron
  Léolia Jeanjean
  Karen Marthiens

The following players received entry from the qualifying draw:
  Audrey Albié
  Alicia Barnett
  Sarah Beth Grey
  Amandine Monnot
  Victoria Muntean
  Mallaurie Noël
  Alice Robbe
  Karman Thandi

Champions

Singles

  Chloé Paquet def.  Simona Waltert, 6–4, 6–3

Doubles

  Mariam Bolkvadze /  Samantha Murray Sharan def.  Audrey Albié /  Léolia Jeanjean, 7–6(7–5), 6–0

References

External links
 2021 Internationaux Féminins de la Vienne at ITFtennis.com
 Official website

2021 ITF Women's World Tennis Tour
2021 in French tennis
October 2021 sports events in France